Bowery Battalion is a 1951 comedy film directed by William Beaudine and starring The Bowery Boys. The film was released on January 24, 1951, by Monogram Pictures and is the twenty-first film in the series.

Plot
The military is performing a practice air raid on New York City. Sach convinces the boys that it is real and they go down to the recruiter's office and enlist. Meanwhile, Slip arrives at Louie's and finds out what just happened and goes down there to stop them. He is too late, as they have already joined, and is tricked into enlisting himself.

Louie tries to enlist as well, but is turned away as being too old. He was, however, in World War I and when he was there he invented the 'Hydrogen Ray', which did not work as intended. However, the army is using the plans for that ray as a decoy to try to capture spies that are at the local base…the same base the boys have been assigned to. The army decides to reinstate Louie to use him as bait for the spies. He ends up being kidnapped by the spies, and they try to get the secrets of the ray out of him. The boys come to his rescue and are rewarded with medals for bravery, and then sent to the brig for leaving their posts to rescue Louie.

Cast

The Bowery Boys
 Leo Gorcey as Terrance Aloysius 'Slip' Mahoney
 Huntz Hall as Horace Debussy 'Sach' Jones
 William Benedict as Whitey
 David Gorcey as Chuck
 Buddy Gorman as Butch

Remaining cast
 Bernard Gorcey as Louie Dumbrowski
 Donald MacBride as Frisbie
 Virginia Hewitt as Marsha
 Russell Hicks as Hatfield
 Emil Sitka as the waiter

Home media
Warner Archives released the film on made-to-order DVD in the United States as part of "The Bowery Boys, Volume Four" on August 26, 2014.

References

External links
 
 
 
 

Bowery Boys films
American black-and-white films
1950s English-language films
1951 comedy films
1951 films
Monogram Pictures films
Military humor in film
Films directed by William Beaudine
American comedy films
1950s American films